Hellenic Journal of Geosciences (formerly Annales Géologiques des Pays Hélléniques) publishes original contributions on all aspects of earth sciences. The Hellenic Journal of Geosciences is published bThe University of Athens, Faculty of Geology and Geoenvironment performs the distribution of the journal, which is distributed in 200 libraries and Institutes in Europe, 103 in Greece and 66 in the rest of the world.

External links 

Hellenic Journal of Geosciences

Geology journals
Earth and atmospheric sciences journals
Science and technology in Greece